A unity candle is a candle used in a wedding ceremony to symbolize two people joining in marriage.

History
The lighting of a "unity candle" is a relatively new custom in wedding ceremonies. There is no record of it in the bible or any Apostolic writings. The custom first became popular in the second half of the 20th century in American Christian weddings.  The origins are unclear, however the use of a unity candle in a 1981 episode of General Hospital may have helped to popularize the practice.

Symbolism
Use of a unity candle generally symbolizes the joining of two individuals into the marriage bond, but additional allusions may be invoked.  The flame may be said to represent the passion in each individual's soul for their spouse. For Christians, it may be compared to the Holy Spirit and Jesus, who is the light of the world, within the souls of those who are baptized.

Use
Two taper candles are initially lit and used by each member of the marrying couple.  These tapers are then used to light a larger pillar candle in the center.  Variations may include additional tapers used by parents to light the tapers that represent the individuals being married.

When the practice is intended to symbolize simply the joining together of the bride and groom, the tapers may be blown out, to indicate that the two lives have been permanently merged, or they may remain lit beside the central candle, symbolizing that the now-married partners have not lost their individuality.

Inclusion in Church Weddings
While the use of unity candles within the marriage rite has become widespread, it is a recent invention and not explicitly part of the Churches Apostolic Tradition and therefore prohibited in some churches. It is advisable that couples and their Wedding planner should always check with the pastor before including the ceremony in their order of service.

Anglican Church Weddings
The Candle Ceremony is not part of the Anglican wedding ceremonies, although it may be allowed at the discretion of the pastor.

Roman Catholic Church Weddings
The Unity Candle Ceremony is not part of the Catholic Wedding Ceremony. Catholic Tradition, instead, sees the regular reception of the Holy Eucharist as the heart of Christian Unity. The recently updated Catholic Rite of Marriage does not include any provisions for the Unity Candle Ceremony. For this reason, many parishes do not allow its inclusion in the ceremony. While the US Conference of Catholic Bishops has not explicitly prohibited the use of the unity candle in the marriage rite, neither has it encouraged the practice.  The Conference has noted that the policies of most dioceses do not prohibit this custom but many suggest that it be done at the reception since the Rite of Marriage already has abundant symbols of unity.  The analysis of the Bishops regarding unity candles concludes by indicating that if the unity candle is permitted, the couple should light their individual candles from the paschal candle, the individual candles should not be extinguished and the unity candle should not be placed on the altar. By following this direction, the lighted candles can then be seen as a way of emphasizing the couple's union in the sacramental and vocational nature of their marriage.

Mixed Marriages and the Unity of Baptism

In the Sacred Tradition of the Catholic Church, a marriage is sacramental in nature when the couple are both baptized Christians. This fact can help to give a more Christian interpretation of the Unity Candle, especially in a mixed marriage between a Catholic and a Christian of another Tradition. It is desirable at a Catholic Wedding for Holy Communion to be distributed. However, given that Holy Communion is not encouraged at a mixed Wedding, where one of the spouses together with a large part of the congregation is not Catholic, the use of a Unity Candle might be employed as a sign of the baptismal unity of the couple.
Since in the rite of baptism, the lighted Paschal Candle and a smaller candle plays an important symbolic part. In the baptism rite, the Paschal Candle is placed near the font. After the person has been baptized with water, another smaller candle is lit by a Godparent from the flame of the Paschal Candle and given to the newly baptized as a sign that they have received the "light of Christ". They are instructed to keep the "flame" they have received to "keep burning brightly" until the return of the Lord (Parousia). This call to vigilance is a reference to the discipleship nature of baptized Christians who are called to evangelize through their vocational calling. The fact that each of the couple shares the same light signifies the unitive nature of their Christian vocation. St. Paul expresses the evangelizing nature of Christian marriage in his letter to the Ephesians 5:22-33. He says "Wives, submit yourselves to your own husbands as you do to the Lord" and "Husbands, love your wives, just as Christ loved the church and gave himself up for her"

References 

Wedding traditions
Candles